HMS Ophelia was an  built for the Royal Navy during the First World War, entering service in 1916. The ship served at the Battle of Jutland on 31 May/1 June 1916, and sank a German submarine in 1918. She was sold for scrap in 1921.

Description
The Admiralty M class were improved and faster versions of the preceding s. They displaced . They were powered by three Parsons direct-drive steam turbines, each driving one propeller shaft, using steam provided by four Yarrow boilers. The ships' complement was 76 officers and ratings.

The ships were armed with three single QF  Mark IV guns and two QF 1.5-pounder (37 mm) anti-aircraft guns. These latter guns were later replaced by a pair of QF 2-pounder (40 mm) "pom-pom" anti-aircraft guns. The ships were also fitted with two above water twin mounts for  torpedoes.

Construction and service
Ophelia was ordered under the Third War Programme in November 1914 and laid down on 1 February 1915 by William Doxford & Sons at their shipyard in Sunderland. The ship was launched on 13 October and completed in May 1916.

Ophelia was attached to the 4th Destroyer Flotilla, part of the Grand Fleet during the Battle of Jutland on 31 May/1 June 1916. The four destroyers engaged German ships which were carrying out a torpedo attack on the 3rd Battlecruiser Squadron. Ophelia fired one torpedo that missed its target, but was undamaged.

After Jutland, Ophelia joined the newly established 14th Destroyer Flotilla, also part of the Grand Fleet. On 10 September 1918, Ophelia was on patrol, with a Kite balloon deployed, when the observer in the balloon spotted the conning tower of a submarine. The submarine dived, but Ophelia dropped depth charges on the site of the submarine's submergence, which were rewarded by a large underwater explosion and a large oil slick. Ophelia had sunk the German submarine .

By the end of the war, Ophelia had transferred to the 3rd Destroyer Flotilla. She was sold for breaking up to the Slough Trading Company on 11 November 1921.

Pennant numbers

Notes

Bibliography

External links 
 Battle of Jutland Crew Lists Project - HMS Ophelia Crew List

 

Admiralty M-class destroyers
Ships built on the River Wear
1915 ships
World War I destroyers of the United Kingdom